Lorenz is an originally German name derived from the Roman surname Laurentius, which means "from Laurentum".

Given name 
People with the given name Lorenz include:
 Prince Lorenz of Belgium (born 1955), member of the Belgian royal family by his marriage with Princess Astrid of Belgium
 Lorenz Böhler (1885–1973), Austrian trauma surgeon
 Lorenz Hart (1895–1943), American lyricist, half of the famed Broadway songwriting team Rodgers and Hart
 Lorenz Lange (1690–1752), Russian official in Siberia
 Lorenz Oken (1779–1851), German naturalist
 Lorenz of Werle (1338/40–1393/94), Lord of Werle-Güstrow

Surname 
People with the name surname Lorenz include:

 Adolf Lorenz (1854–1946), Austrian surgeon
 Alfred Lorenz (1868–1939), Austrian-German musical analyst
 Angela Lorenz (born 1965), American artist
 Barbara Lorenz, make-up artist
 Carl Lorenz (1913–1993), German cyclist
 Christian Lorenz (born 1966), German musician
 Edward Norton Lorenz (1917–2008), American mathematician and meteorologist
 Francis S. Lorenz (1914–2008), American jurist and politician
 Friedrich Lorenz (1897–1944), German Catholic priest
 Hans Lorenz (1865–1940), German engineer and physicist
 Konrad Lorenz (1903–1989), Austrian zoologist, ethologist, and ornithologist
 Kuno Lorenz (born 1932), German philosopher
 Lee Lorenz (1932-2022), American cartoonist
 Ludvig Lorenz (1829–1891), Danish mathematician and physicist
 Max Lorenz (tenor) (1901–1975), German tenor
 Max O. Lorenz, (1880–1962), American economist
 Michael Lorenz (footballer) (born 1979), German footballer
 Michael Lorenz (musicologist) (born 1958), Austrian musicologist
 Michael Lorenz (veterinarian), American veterinary scientist
 Ottokar Lorenz (1832–1904), Austrian-German historian and genealogist
 Richard Lorenz (artist) German artist painted in the western genre 
 Stephen R. Lorenz (born 1951), American Commander, Air Education and Training Command, United States Air Force
 Richard Lorenz (bobsleigh) (born 1901, death unknown), Austrian bobsledder
 Taylor Lorenz, American journalist
 Ulrike Lorenz (born 1963), German art historian and president of the Klassik Stiftung Weimar
 Werner Lorenz (1891–1974), German SS-General and war criminal
 William Lorenz (1882–1958), American physician, psychiatrist, and U.S. Army medical officer in World War I

Fictional Characters
Lorenz Hellman Gloucester, a character from the video game Fire Emblem: Three Houses

See also
 Lorentz, spelled with a "t" 

Surnames from given names
German-language surnames
German masculine given names